West Peckham Preceptory was a preceptory in West Peckham, Kent, England.

History
West Peckham Preceptory was founded circa 1408 by Sir John Culpeper of Oxon Hoath, West Peckham. It was held by the Knights Hospitallers, and used by them as an administrative centre. The preceptory remained in the possession of the Knights Hospitallers until it was dissolved by King Henry VIII circa 1523. At the time of the dissolution, it was valued at £63 6s 8d and had an income of £60 per annum.

References

Sources

 p59

Monasteries in Kent
1408 establishments in England
1523 disestablishments in England
Tonbridge and Malling
History of Kent
1400s establishments in England
1520s disestablishments in England
Christian monasteries established in the 15th century
Preceptories of the Knights Hospitaller in England